Psalm 138 is the 138th psalm of the Book of Psalms, beginning in English in the King James Version: "I will praise thee with my whole heart". In Latin, it is known as "Confitebor tibi Domine in toto corde meo". The psalm is a hymn psalm.

In the slightly different numbering system used in the Greek Septuagint version of the Bible and in the Latin Vulgate, this psalm is Psalm 137.

The psalm forms a regular part of Jewish, Catholic, Orthodox, and Protestant liturgies. It has often been set to music, by composers including Claudio Monteverdi, Heinrich Schütz, Marc-Antoine Charpentier, Michel Richard Delalande, Jan Dismas Zelenka, Josef Rheinberger and Stefans Grové.

History and content 
Psalm 138 is the 138th psalm from the Book of Psalms, which is the first book of the Ketuvim ("Writings") in the Hebrew Bible, and is also a book of the Christian Old Testament. It is part of the final Davidic collection of psalms, comprising Psalms 138 through 145, which are specifically attributed to David in their opening verses. However, Dunn and Rogerson assert that the psalm was written as an expression of thankfulness after the return from exile in Babylon. This particular psalm describes that those who are close to God live in reality, and those who believe in human power live in a world of fantasy.

The singer begins with individual thanks for God's lasting love and care. The hope that it will endure forever ends the psalm, framing the middle section which first calls to universal thanks and praise, and then mentions ongoing adversaries and trouble which the singer is sure to overcome with God's help.

Text

Hebrew Bible version
Following is the Hebrew text of Psalm 138:

King James Version 
 [A Psalm] of David.
I will praise thee with my whole heart: before the gods will I sing praise unto thee.
 I will worship toward thy holy temple, and praise thy name for thy lovingkindness and for thy truth: for thou hast magnified thy word above all thy name.
 In the day when I cried thou answeredst me, and strengthenedst me with strength in my soul.
 All the kings of the earth shall praise thee, O L, when they hear the words of thy mouth.
 Yea, they shall sing in the ways of the L: for great is the glory of the L.
 Though the L be high, yet hath he respect unto the lowly: but the proud he knoweth afar off.
 Though I walk in the midst of trouble, thou wilt revive me: thou shalt stretch forth thine hand against the wrath of mine enemies, and thy right hand shall save me.
 The L will perfect that which concerneth me: thy mercy, O L, endureth for ever: forsake not the works of thine own hands.

Verse 1
I will praise You with my whole heart;Before the gods I will sing praises to You.Alexander Kirkpatrick notes that the object of the psalmist's praise is not named, nor is it necessary that the  should be named, although in certain "ancient versions", "the Lord" is added. Among modern translations, the New Revised Standard Version and the Modern English Version add "O Lord".

Uses
Judaism
Psalm 138 is traditionally recited as a psalm of thanks and gratitude to God.

Verse 2 is recited during Selichot.

Verse 4 is the verse said by the mule in Perek Shirah.

Verses 3 and 8 are recited at the end of the Amidah by people whose names begin with the first letter of the verse and end with the last letter of the verse.

Catholic Church
Historically, this psalm was recited or sung at the office of Vespers on Wednesdays, according to the Rule of St. Benedict.Psautier latin-français du bréviaire monastique, p. 516, 1938/2003. In the Liturgy of the Hours, Psalm 138 is recited at Vespers on the Tuesday of the fourth week of the four weekly liturgical cycle. In the liturgy of the Mass, it is played on the 21st Sunday of Ordinary Time of the year, the 5th and the 17th Sunday in Ordinary Time of the year.

 Musical settings 
The psalm appeared in a rhymed version in the hymnal Genevan Psalter in the 1551 edition. German versions on the same melody, "Mein ganzes Herz erhebet dich", were published from the 18th century, and are part of Protestant and Catholic hymnals.

Heinrich Schütz set Psalm 138 in German, "Aus meines Herzens Grunde" (From the bottom of my heart) as part of his settings of the Becker Psalter, published in 1628, SWV 243. Marc-Antoine Charpentier, 4 settings, (H.200, H.200 a, H.151, H.225, H.220), Michel Richard Delalande set the psalm in Latin, "Confitebor tibi Domine in toto corde meo", S48, for soloists, chorus and orchestra in 1697. Henri Desmarets composed a setting for soloists, a five-part choir and orchestra in 1707. Jan Dismas Zelenka wrote 5 settings for soloists, chorus and orchestra, ZWV 70-73 and ZWV 100. Josef Rheinberger composed a four-part setting in Latin- "Confitebor tibi Domine" as No. 4 of his Fünf Motetten'' (Five motets), Op. 163, in 1885. The South African composer Stefans Grové wrote a setting for children's choir, choir, African drums, marimba, and string orchestra in 2002.

References

Cited sources

External links

 
 Psalms Chapter 138 text in Hebrew and English, mechon-mamre.org
 I thank you, Lord, with all my heart text and footnotes, usccb.org United States Conference of Catholic Bishops
 Psalm 138:1 introduction and text, biblestudytools.com
 Psalm 138 enduringword.com
Hymnary.org, Hymns for Psalm 138

138
Works attributed to David